One Fish, Two Fish, Crawfish, Bluefish: The Smithsonian Sustainable Seafood Cookbook is a collection of seafood recipes specifically chosen for their environmental sustainability. It was written by Carole C. Baldwin and Julie H. Mounts, illustrated by Charlotte Knox, and published in October 2003 by Smithsonian Institution Press.

The title of the book is a reference to One Fish Two Fish Red Fish Blue Fish, a popular children's book by the famous children’s author Dr. Seuss.

References 


External links 
Smithsonian Seafood Website

2003 non-fiction books
Cookbooks